Fatoni University (FTU) is a private Islamic university in Pattani Province, Thailand.

References

External links
 

Universities in Thailand